The Newcomers was a late 1960s BBC soap opera which dealt with the subject of a London family, the Coopers, who moved to a housing estate in the fictional country town of Angleton. It was broadcast in bi-weekly half-hour episodes from October 1965 until November 1969. It was initially produced by Verity Lambert.

Series outline 
A fictional light industrial manufacturing company called Eden Brothers decides to relocate to the rural location. There are conflicts with the older members of the existing community, as well as some lighter moments as urbanites encounter "country characters".  Many of the relocated workers have trouble living outside the city. As the series progresses, problems on the factory floor spill over into the community. Throughout this the Coopers strive to raise their daughter and two sons, who are having their own issues. The Cooper and Harker families were the initial focus of the series.  The on-screen sudden death of the character of Ellis Cooper led to a gradual shift away from the Coopers, who by the end of the serial barely featured.

A change of the managing director of Eden Bros to Andrew Kerr heralded the arrival of his daughter Kirsty, played by Jenny Agutter, but only during her school holidays.

Only five complete editions are known to have survived:

 Episode 51 – Original transmission 29 March 1966.
 Episode 59 – Original transmission 26 April 1966.
 Episode 166 - Original transmission 5 May 1967.
 Episode 172 – Original transmission 26 May 1967.
 Episode 222 – Original transmission 7 December 1967.

Cast

 Alan Browning as Ellis Cooper
 Maggie Fitzgibbon as Vivienne Cooper
 Jeremy Bulloch as Phillip Cooper
 Judy Geeson as Maria Cooper
 Raymond Hunt as Lance Cooper
 Gladys Henson as Grandma Hamilton
 Robert Brown as Bert Harker
 June Bland as Vera Harker
 David Janson as Jimmy Harker
 Wendy Richard as Joyce Harker
 Robin Bailey as Andrew Kerr
 Heather Chasen as Caroline Kerr
 Jenny Agutter as Kirsty Kerr
 Jack Watling as Hugh Robertson
 Mary Kenton as Olivia Robertson
 Deborah Watling as Julie Robertson
 Paul Bartlett as Adrian Robertson
 Robert Bartlett as Michael Robertson
 Vanda Godsell as Katie Heenan
 Tony Steedman as Arthur Huntley
 Naomi Chance as Amelia Huntley
 Sally Lahee as Eunice Huntley
 Patrick Connor as Peter Connelly
 Michael Collins as Jeff Langley
 Sandra Payne as Janet Langley
 Joan Newell as Mrs Langley
 Glynn Edwards as George Harbottle
 Hilda Braid as Mrs Harbottle
 Stephen Grives as Tim Harbottle
 Margaret Nolan as Mercedes 
 Michael Standing as Tom Lloyd
 Helen Cotterill as Betty Lloyd
 Keith Smith as Dick Alderbeach
 Naomi Chance as Amelia Claythorne
 Anthony Verner as Sydney Huxley
 Mark Eden as Jeremy Crowe
 Patsy Smart as Mary Grange
 Megs Jenkins as Mrs Penrose
 Eileen Helsby as Prudence Penrose
 Victor Platt as Charles Penrose

Production
The show was recorded principally in the BBC's West London studios, mainly Riverside 1, and also at BBC Birmingham Studios, with external scenes filmed in Haverhill, a town in South-west Suffolk, which itself expanded rapidly in the 1950s and 1960s through residents moving from London. The opening sequences of the first episode showed the Cooper family driving to their new home, this was actually Thaxted in Essex. The cast included several actors who later achieved wider fame, including Alan Browning (later seen in Coronation Street), Maggie Fitzgibbon, Judy Geeson, Jenny Agutter and Wendy Richard.  In two episodes the group Jimmy Powell and the Five Dimensions were featured and appeared at the pub. (They were billed as "the New Dimensions"). They performed their new Decca 45 'I Just Can't Get Over You'.

References

External links 
 
The Newcomers at BFI Screenonline
The Newcomers at Lost Shows

British television soap operas
BBC television dramas
1960s British television soap operas
1965 British television series debuts
1969 British television series endings
Black-and-white British television shows
English-language television shows
Lost BBC episodes